William Wade Johnston (April 9, 1898 – March 8, 1978) was an American baseball player. He was born in 1898 in Middleport, Ohio. He played in Negro major leagues as an outfielder from 1920 to 1932. In 12 seasons in the majors, he compiled a .303 batting average, .373 on-base percentage, and totaled 790 hits, 487 runs scored, and 371 RBIs. He led the Negro National League with 10 triples in 1930 and with 35 walks in 1931. He died in 1978 in Steubenville, Ohio.

References

External links
 and Baseball-Reference Black Baseball stats and Seamheads

Cleveland Tate Stars players
Indianapolis ABCs (1931–1933) players
Detroit Stars players
Kansas City Monarchs players
St. Louis Stars (baseball) players
People from Middleport, Ohio
1898 births
1978 deaths
Baseball players from Ohio
Sportspeople from Steubenville, Ohio
Baltimore Black Sox players
Baseball outfielders
20th-century African-American sportspeople